Croatia competed at the 2009 Mediterranean Games held in Pescara, Italy, from 25 June to 5 July 2009. This was the nation's fifth consecutive appearance at the Mediterranean Games.

Medalists

Athletics 

Key
Note–Ranks given for track events are within the athlete's heat only
Q = Qualified for the next round
q = Qualified for the next round as a fastest loser or, in field events, by position without achieving the qualifying target
NR = National record
N/A = Round not applicable for the event
Bye = Athlete not required to compete in round

Men
Track & road events

Field events

Women
Track & road events

Field events

Basketball

Men's tournament

Group A

Quarterfinal

Semifinal

Final

Women's tournament

Group A

Semifinal

Bronze medal match

Bowls

Lyonnaise

Raffa

Boxing

Men

Canoeing

Sprint

Men

Women

Legend: FA = Qualify to final (medal); FB = Qualify to final B (non-medal)

Cycling

Road

Equestrian

Jumping

Fencing

Women

Gymnastics

Artistic
Men
Team

Individual finals

Handball

Women's tournament

Group A

Judo

Karate

Rowing

Men

Women

Sailing

Men

Women

M = Medal race; EL = Eliminated – did not advance into the medal race;

Shooting 

Men

Women

Swimming

Men

Women

* – Indicates athlete swam in the preliminaries but not in the final race.

Table tennis

Men

Women

Volleyball

Beach

Indoor

Women's tournament

Group B

Nations at the 2009 Mediterranean Games
2009
Mediterranean Games